The American Nurses Credentialing Center (ANCC), a subsidiary of the American Nurses Association (ANA), is a certification body for nursing board certification and the largest certification body for advanced practice registered nurses in the United States,  certifying over 75,000 APRNs, including nurse practitioners and clinical nurse specialists.

ANCC's nursing board certification program is one of the oldest in the USA, and many of its certifications were established before 1980, when nursing certification was still in early developmental stages.

History 

In 1966 The American Nursing Association  amended its bylaws to allow the creation of certification boards for nurses in various areas of practice.

Two years later, the ANC's Nursing Practice Department published a paper promoting certification standards. From the ideas presented in this paper, the Congress for Nursing Practice drafted guidelines for the certification process in 1969. Within a few years, several nursing practice divisions had drafted certification processes based upon these guidelines.

In 1973 the ANA announced a national certification program for nursing practice.  By 1974 the first certification examinations were administered.

Over the following 17 years the ANA continued to expand its nursing credentialing exams to cover more areas of practice and administration.  The ANA decided in 1990 to create the American Nurses Credentialing Center (ANCC) as a subsidiary nonprofit corporation through which it would sell its certification services and exams.

In 1999 the ANCC created an international branch of the organization in order to provide its services outside of the United States.

Primary Accreditation
Established in 1974, Primary Accreditation recognizes organizations (or components of organizations) that offer continuing education for nurses. This accreditation contributes to health care quality and professional nursing practice by defining standards for the development and delivery of continuing education and by providing a voluntary peer review process to assure compliance.

Services 
Other services of the ANCC include an Accreditation Program for nursing continuing education providers and approvers, and the Magnet Recognition Program, which rates medical institutions for their nursing excellence. The ANCC also runs the Pathway to Excellence program to help hospitals improve their working environment for nurses.

In 1998 the ANCC created the Institute for Research, Education, and Consultation (IREC) which provides the following services: Certification, Magnet Recognition Program, Pathway to Excellence, and Accreditation.

Certification-related products and services 
 Live review seminars
 National study groups
 Web-based e-learning
 Certification review manuals
 Web-based practice questions and answers

Magnet recognition program-related products and services 
 Annual National Magnet Conference
 Magnet workshops
 Consulting services
 Web-based e-learning

Pathway to Excellence program-related products and services 
 Pathway workshops
 Consulting services
 Web-based e-learning

Accreditation program-related products and services 
 Annual Accreditation Symposium
 Consulting services

Certification exams 
ANCC offers certification programs in 29 nursing specialties:
 Ambulatory care nursing
 Cardiac vascular nursing
 Gerontological nursing
 Informatics nursing
 Medical-surgical nursing
 Nurse Executive (formerly Nursing Administration)
 Nursing Case Management
 Nursing Professional Development
 Pain Management
 Pediatric nursing
 Psychiatric and mental health nursing
 Public Health Nursing - Advanced
 Acute Care Nurse Practitioner
 Adult Nurse Practitioner
 Adult Psychiatric & Mental Health Nurse Practitioner
 Family Nurse Practitioner
 Family Psychiatric and Mental Health Nurse Practitioner
 Gerontological Nurse Practitioner
 Pediatric Nurse Practitioner ( ANCC no longer offers this certification) 
 Adult Health Clinical Nurse Specialist
 Adult Psychiatric and Mental Health Clinical Nurse Specialist
 Child/Adolescent Psychiatric and Mental Health Clinical Nurse Specialist
 Gerontological Clinical Nurse Specialist
 Pediatric Clinical Nurse Specialist
 Advanced Practice Adult Psychiatric and Mental Health Nursing
 Nurse Executive, Advanced (formerly Nursing Administration, Advanced)

References

External links

Credentialing Center
Healthcare accreditation organizations in the United States
Nursing organizations in the United States
Medical and health organizations based in Maryland
1991 establishments in the United States